The Porphyrit-Hornstein Formation is a geologic formation in Montenegro. It preserves bivalve fossils dating back to the Ladinian of the Triassic period.

Fossil content 
The following fossils were reported from the formation:
 Bivalves
 Ostreida
 Halobiidae
 Daonella (Arzelella) indica
 Daonella (Pichlerella) pichleri

See also 
 List of fossiliferous stratigraphic units in Montenegro

References

Bibliography 
 

Geologic formations of Montenegro
Triassic System of Europe
Ladinian Stage
Deep marine deposits
Paleontology in Montenegro